Eighth Street or 8th Street may refer to:

Roads and bridges
Eighth Street (Manhattan), a street in Manhattan, New York City
8th Street East (Saskatoon), a street in Saskatoon, Saskatchewan
 Calle Ocho, a street in Little Havana, Miami
Albertus L. Meyers Bridge, also known as the Eighth Street Bridge, in Allentown, Pennsylvania
Eighth Street Bridge (Passaic River)

Public transportation
Eighth Street station (disambiguation), train stations of the name

Buildings
Eighth Street Apartments, residence halls at Georgia Institute of Technology
Eighth Street Elementary School, an elementary school in  Ocala, Florida
Eighth Street Middle School, a public middle school in Tifton, Georgia
West Eighth Street Historic District, a historic district in Anderson, Indiana

See also 
Eighth Avenue (disambiguation)
Calle Ocho (disambiguation), in Spanish